In terms of rocketry, Ares could mean:
Ares I and Ares V, canceled rockets part of the Constellation program
Ares ICBM, a proposed ICBM and SST launch vehicle
Aerial Regional-scale Environmental Survey (ARES), a proposed Martian rocket airplane
Aries (rocket), a modified LGM-30 Minuteman missile, used to test missile defense systems

See also
Ares (disambiguation)